The 2014 United States Mixed Doubles Curling Championship was held from December 4-8, 2013 at the Medford Curling Club in Medford, Wisconsin. Joyance Meechai, from New York, and Steve Gebauer, from Minnesota, won the tournament, earning the right to represent the United States at the 2014 World Mixed Doubles Curling Championship in Dumfries, Scotland.

Teams 
Sixteen teams qualified to compete in the championship.

Round robin 

The 16 teams were split into two pools of 8 teams. Each pool played a round robin and at the end the top two teams advanced to the playoffs. The standings at the end of the round robin phase were:

Playoffs

Bracket

Semifinals
Sunday, December 8, 9:00am CT

Final
Sunday, December 8, 12:00pm CT

References 

United States National Curling Championships
Curling in Wisconsin
United States Mixed Doubles Championship
Sports competitions in Wisconsin
United States Mixed Doubles Curling Championship
United States Mixed Doubles Curling Championship
United States